Strathwhillan is a tiny community on the Isle of Arran in the Firth of Clyde, Scotland. It is really a suburb of the much larger village of Brodick. There are no amenities to speak of in the area, save for a local guest house.

External links

 Guesthouse Website

Villages in the Isle of Arran